The following is a timeline of the history of the city of Catania in the Sicily region of Italy.

Prior to 18th century

 729 BCE – Catina founded by Naxians.
 476 BCE – Hiero I of Syracuse expels residents to Leontini; settlement renamed "Aetna".
 461 BCE – Settlement named "Catina" again.
 403 BCE – Catina taken by forces of Dionysius I of Syracuse.
 263 BCE – Catina taken by Roman forces during the First Punic War.
 122 BCE – .
 2nd C. CE - Amphitheatre of Catania
 251 CE - Lava stream threatens the town.
 535 CE – Belisarius of the Byzantine Empire takes Sicily.
 4th–5th C. CE – Roman Catholic diocese of Catania active.
 902 CE – Catania "sacked by the Saracens" during the Muslim conquest of Sicily.
 1090 – Catania Cathedral founded.
 1169 – February: 1169 Sicily earthquake.
 1194 – Catania sacked by forces of Henry VI, Holy Roman Emperor.
 1232 – Political unrest.
 1239 - Castello Ursino (castle) ordered to be constructed by Emperor Frederick II, King of Sicily.
 1282 – War of the Sicilian Vespers.
 1296 – "Parliament at Catania elected Frederick of Aragon king of Sicily."
 1350 – Castello Ursino (castle) built.
 1435 – "Social unrest."
 1434 – University of Catania opens.
 1647 – Political unrest.
 1669 – 1669 Etna eruption causes destruction in region near city.
 1687 –  (church) construction begins.
 1693 – January: 1693 Sicily earthquake causes much destruction in city.

18th–19th centuries
 1709 – Palazzo Tezzano construction begins.
 1713 – San Benedetto church built.
 1737 –  (fountain) installed in the Piazza del Duomo.
 1755 – University Library established.
 1817 – February: Earthquake.(it)
 1824 –  (learned society) formed.
 1843 – Catania provincial archives established.
 1858 – Orto Botanico dell'Università di Catania (garden) established.
 1862 – August: Catania "held by Garibaldi."
 1866 
  (cemetery) established.
 Catania Centrale railway station inaugurated.
 1869 –  (train station) opens.
 1871 – Population: 84,397.
 1876 – Observatory established.
 1881 - Population: 100,417.
 1882 –  erected in the Piazza Stesicoro.
 1883 – Giardino Bellini (park) opens.
 1890 – Teatro Massimo Bellini (theatre) opens.

20th century

 1905 –  begins operating.
 1908 – Calcio Catania football club formed.
 1911 – Population: 210,703.
 1915 –  begins operating.
 1929 - Calcio Catania (football club) founded.
 1930 –  (stadium) opens.
 1931 –  (library) established.
 1937 – Stadio Cibali (stadium) opens.
 1943 – July: City bombed in the Allied invasion of Sicily during World War II.
 1944 – 14 December: Palazzo degli Elefanti (city hall) burns down.
 1945 – La Sicilia newspaper begins publication.
 1949
  (transit entity) established.
  begins operating.
 1954 –  opens.
 1957 –  neighborhood.
 1958 – Teatro Stabile di Catania founded.
 1963 – State Archive of Catania active.
 1969 – Teatro Verga (theatre) built.
 1971
 City divided into 26 administrative units.(it)
 Population: 400,048.
 1978 – City reorganized into 17 administrative units.(it)
 1988 – Enzo Bianco becomes mayor.
 1995 – City reorganized into 10 administrative units: Barriera-Canalicchio, Borgo-Sanzio, Centro-San Cristoforo-Angeli Custodi, Monte Po-Nesima, Ognina-Picanello-Stazione, San Giorgio-Librino, San Giuseppe La Rena-Zia Lisa, and Trappeto-Cibali.(it)
 1997 – PalaCatania arena opens.
 1998 – Mercati Generali nightclub in business near city.
 1999 – Catania Metro begins operating.
 2000 – Umberto Scapagnini becomes mayor.

21st century

 2007 – Catania–Fontanarossa Airport new terminal opens.
 2012 – 28 October: Sicilian regional election, 2012 held.
 2013
 City reorganized into six administrative units: Borgo Sanzio, Centro San Giovanni Galermo-Trappeto-Cibali, Centro Storico, Monte Po-Nesima-San Leone-Rapisardi, Picanello-Ognina-Barriera-Canalicchio, and San Giorgio-Librino-San Giuseppe La Rena-Zia Lisa-Villaggio Sant'Agata.(it)
 Population: 290,678 city; 1,077,113 province.

See also
 Catania history
 
 List of mayors of Catania
 History of Sicily
 Timelines of other cities in the macroregion of Insular Italy:(it)
 Sardinia: Timeline of Cagliari 
 Sicily: Timeline of Messina, Palermo, Syracuse, Trapani

References

This article incorporates information from the Italian Wikipedia.

Bibliography

in English
 
 
  + 1867 ed.

in Italian

 
  (List of libraries)

External links

  (city archives)
 Items related to Catania, various dates (via Europeana)
 Items related to Catania, various dates (via Digital Public Library of America)

Catania
Catania
catania